The Zen Nippon Iaidō Renmei (ZNIR) or All Japan Iaidō Federation (全日本居合道連盟 abbreviated 全日居 "Zen Nichi I" or 全居連 "Zen I Ren") is a national non-governmental organization in Japan, founded in 1948 by Ikeda Hayato (later Prime Minister of Japan). The ZNIR was officially formed and registered with the government on May 5, 1954 by Iaido practitioners from multiple styles. The ZNIR is Japan's oldest and largest Iaidō-only specialist organization. It holds yearly National Kyoto Iaidō Event in Kyoto, Japan typically from May 3 to May 5 and Hamamatsu National Iaidō Competition Tournament in Hamamatsu city in October. ZNIR also holds many other regional Iaidō tournaments regularly throughout the years.

History
The All Japan Iaido Federation was founded in 1948, and recognized officially as an organization with the Japanese Government in 1954.

In 1956, the ZNIR established 全日本居合道連盟刀法 (Zen Nippon Iaidō Renmei Tōhō) in an effort to unify practitioners and create a common set to fairly grade each practitioner from varying styles.

Structure
ZNIR has ten Chiku Renmei (district federations):
 Kantō region
 Kinki region
 Chūbu region
 Tōkai region
 Chūgoku region
 Shikoku region
 Kyushu/Okinawa region
 Hokuriku region
 Tōhoku region
 Hokkaido region

Styles

The All Japan Iaido Federation contains multiple traditional styles, in no particular order:

 Musō Jikiden Eishin-ryū
 Sekiguchi-ryū
 Shinkage-ryū
 Musō Shinden-ryū
 Mugai-ryū
 Shinden-ryū
 Hōki-ryū
 Araki Muninsai-ryū
 Shindō Munen-ryū
 Hokushin Itto-ryū

Shared Techniques, or Tōhō (刀法)

Due to the varying styles in the All Japan Iaido Federation, a set of common techniques, or waza, were created in 1956 to examine a practitioner's skill in a fair manner, each borrowed from five major styles in the Federation.

This set is known collectively as "Tōhō" (刀法):

 Mae-giri from Musō Jikiden Eishin-ryū, founded during the late Muromachi period - ca. 1590 
 Zengo-giri from Mugai-ryū, founded in 1695
 Kiri-age from Shindō Munen-ryū, founded in the early 1700s
 Shihō-giri from Suiō-ryū, founded during the early Edo period - ca. 1615
 Kissaki-gaeshi from Hōki-ryū, founded during the late Muromachi period - ca.1590

Events
Other than the Kyoto Iaidō Taikai(tournament) in May, the ZNIR also holds a Zenkoku Kyōgi Taikai in the fall of every year. Each Chiku Renmei(district) also hold their own local Iaidō tournament and exam.

Ranking System

The All Japan Iaidō Federation grants ranks similarly to other Japanese martial arts organizations, with Dan and Shōgō (titles) both granted to practitioners once they reach certain levels of competency and skill.

After Mudansha (無段者, no Dan), there are:
 Sho Dan (初段, 1st Dan rank)
 Ni Dan (弐段, 2nd Dan rank)
 San Dan (参段, 3rd Dan rank)
 Yon Dan or Yo Dan (四段, 4th Dan rank)
 Go Dan (五段, 5th Dan rank)
 Roku Dan (六段, 6th Dan rank)
 Renshi (錬士 or "Polished/Forged Instructor")
 Nana Dan or Shichi Dan (七段, 7th Dan rank)
 Kyoshi (教士 or "Advanced Senior Teacher")
 Hachi Dan (八段, 8th Dan rank)
 Jun Hanshi (準範士 or "Associate Hanshi")
 Hanshi (範士 or "Senior expert")
 Kyu Dan or Ku Dan (九段, 9th Dan rank)
 Jū Dan (十段, 10th Dan rank)
 Meijin (名人 or "Excellent/Brilliant person", refers to a highly skilled grand-master. Only for president of the ZNIR.)

Like other martial arts organizations, Shōgō (title) are granted, however they are considered to be levels or rankings similarly to Dan, and are typically granted between the various Dan levels above Roku Dan.

For example, after Roku Dan and a certain amount of time has passed, the practitioner will test for Renshi at their next grading.

References

Japanese swordsmanship
Iaido
Japanese martial arts
Sports organizations of Japan
Sports organizations established in 1948
1948 establishments in Japan